Baznoy is a rural locality (a khutor) in Basakinskoye Rural Settlement, Chernyshkovsky District, Volgograd Oblast, Russia. The population was 109 as of 2010. There are 4 streets.

Geography 
Baznoy is located on Don Plain, on south-west of Volgograd Oblast, 32 km south of Chernyshkovsky (the district's administrative centre) by road. Verkhnegnutov is the nearest rural locality.

References 

Rural localities in Chernyshkovsky District